Health Nutz is a Canadian television situation comedy series created by Jason Friesen, who is also the writer and executive producer. The series was produced by Jason Friesen and Dasha D. Novak and aired on APTN. The pilot episode was shown on APTN on December 27, 2010. The series ran for two seasons, starting on March 22, 2011 and on January 11, 2013.

Setting
Buzz Riel Jr., a former professional hockey player who since a career-ending accident has become an alcoholic gambler, inherits the Health Nutz juice bar in North Vancouver and an associated lucrative energy drink patent from his estranged father on condition that he gets and stays sober. The pilot was filmed at a run-down pub on Hastings Street and used exteriors at Orange Number 5, a strip joint.

Cast
 Kevin Loring – Buzz Riel Jr.
 Lucie Guest
 Ali Liebert
 Chris Gauthier
 Chad Krowchuk
 Byron Chief-Moon – Chief Floyd Two-Rivers, Buzz Sr.'s right-hand man and executor, and a former alcoholic
 David Hamilton Lyle
 Cyler Point
 Sam Bob
 Jim Shield
 Ken Lawson – homeless man who plays the ukulele
 Laura Mennell
 Brian George
 Lexa Doig

References

External links

 

Aboriginal Peoples Television Network original programming
2010s Canadian sitcoms
2011 Canadian television series debuts
2013 Canadian television series endings
First Nations television series